Roy Bennett may refer to:
 Roy Bennett (gridiron football) (born 1961), American and Canadian football defensive back
 Roy Bennett (politician) (1957–2018), Zimbabwean politician
 Roy Anthony Cutaran Bennett (1913–1990), Filipino journalist tortured by Japanese occupiers of Manila during World War II
 Roy C. Bennett (1918–2015), American songwriter